Doko may refer to:

Places
Doko, Benin, arrondissement in Kouffo, Benin
Doko, Democratic Republic of the Congo, town served by Doko Airport
Doko, Guinea, town in Guinea

Languages
Doko language (Bantu), a language spoken in Democratic Republic of Congo
Basketo language, a language spoken in Ethiopia one of whose two dialects is Doko
Uyanga language,  a language spoken in Nigeria, also known as Doko or Iko

Other uses
 Doko (basket), carrying basket used in Nepal and nearby countries
"Doko" (song), song by Kaela Kimura on Hocus Pocus album
Dōkō, Japanese gay men's magazine
Don Doko Don, Japanese video game
Doppelkopf, German card game

People with the name

Surname
Izaak Huru Doko (1913–1985), Indonesian politician
, Japanese women's footballer
Tania Doko, vocalist in Australian 1990s duo Bachelor Girl
Toshiwo Doko, (1896–1988), Japanese engineer
Ibrahim Hussaini Doko, DG Raw Materials Research and Development Councils

Given name
Đoko Šalić (born 1995), Serbian basketball player
Tetsugen Doko (1630–1682), Japanese zen master

See also

Dokos, island of Greece
Dokos shipwreck

Japanese-language surnames